Voskhod is a rural locality (a settlement) in Martovsky Selsoviet, Khabarsky District, Altai Krai, Russia. The population was 75 as of 2013. There is 1 street.

Geography 
Voskhod is located 14 km southwest of Khabary (the district's administrative centre) by road.

References 

Rural localities in Khabarsky District